National Route 6 (N6) is a national highway of Morocco. It is one of the most important road networks linking the west of the country to the east, connecting the capital Rabat and Salé on the west coast  to Maghnia, Algeria on the border. It passes through many of Morocco's major cities such as Oujda,  Fes,  Meknes and Khemisset. For much of the Fes- Rabat leg is runs parallel with the A2 Rabat–Fes expressway.

References
Google maps 

Roads in Morocco